Bertelsmann Music Group (BMG) was a division of a German media company Bertelsmann before its completion of sale of the majority of its assets to Sony Corporation of America on 1 October 2008. Although it was established in 1987, the music company was formed as RCA/Ariola International in 1985 as a joint venture to combine the music label activities of  RCA's RCA Records division and Bertelsmann's Ariola Records and its associated labels which include Arista Records. It consisted of the BMG Music Publishing company, the world's third largest music publisher and the world's largest independent music publisher and (since August 2004) the 50% share of the joint venture with Sony Music, which established the German American Sony BMG from 2004 to 2008.

Acquisition
In 1994, BMG acquired Italian publisher Casa Ricordi, which had been founded in 1808.

In March 1998, BMG sold its video game publisher BMG Interactive to Take-Two Interactive, with Bertelsmann taking a 16 percent stake in Take-Two. BMG Interactive published the Grand Theft Auto video game series.

The joint venture between Sony Corporation and Bertelsmann to merge both companies' music divisions was set up in August 2004. It reduced the Big Five record companies to the Big Four record companies. At that time, the company had a 21.5% share in the global music market. Sony Music and BMG remained separate in Japan, although BMG Music Japan was wholly owned by Sony BMG.

On 27 March 2006, The New York Times reported that Bertelsmann was looking to raise money by leveraging some of its media assets and that executives from both companies were in talks about possibly altering the current venture. In 2008, Bertelsmann sold its 50% share of Sony BMG to Sony Corporation of America for a total of $1.5 billion and the company was renamed back to Sony Music Entertainment Inc.

While officially withdrawing from the business of recorded music, Bertelsmann continued its strong presence in other areas of the music industry by establishing BMG Rights Management, which specializes in music rights management and by representing artists and authors. It is mainly active in European markets. The basis of the company was formed through BMG's decision to withhold selected European music catalogues from the former Sony BMG joint venture and the BMG Publishing businesses.

Also kept separate from the acquisition by Sony Corporation of America was Sony BMG's wholly owned and operated BMG Japan. Sony Music Japan remained independent from the Sony BMG joint venture, therefore BMG and Sony labelling were kept separate in Japan under the venture. During Sony BMG's buyout, BMG Japan was instead picked up by Sony Music Entertainment Japan. It briefly continued to operate as a distinct entity until a reorganization in early 2009 folded the company into Sony Music Japan.

Subsidiaries
Now part of Sony Music Entertainment after the buyout of Bertelsmann SE & Co. KGaA's 50% stake in Sony BMG.

 Ariola Records
 RCA Music Group
 RCA Records
 RCA Victor Group
 The Windham Hill Group
 Bluebird Records
 Arista Records
 J Records
 Full Surface Records
 US Records
 Arista Nashville
 RCA Nashville
 BNA Records
 BMG Kidz
 Zomba Music Group
 Battery Records
 Epidemic Records
 LaFace Records
 Jive Records
 Music for Nations Records
 Multitone Records
 Pinnacle Records
 Scotti Brothers Records
 Silvertone Records
 Verity Records
 Volcano Entertainment
 Zoo Entertainment
 X-Cell Records

BMG Music Publishing
BMG Music Publishing (formerly known as RCA Music Publishing), which was not part of the Sony BMG merger, was a business of the Bertelsmann Music Group until it was sold to Universal Music Group for €1.63 billion in 2007. Universal then folded the company into Universal Music Publishing Group, and the BMG name was retired. The company had been headquartered at 245 Fifth Avenue in New York City, and had 36 offices in 25 countries.

Artists
BMG Music Publishing controlled over one million copyrights. Writers/artists signed to the company included: Elvis Presley, Ann Wilson, Todd Terry, Anastacia, Kylie Minogue,  Jaguares, Diana Yukawa, Kent, Alcazar, Gloria Trevi, Angélica María, Dido, Lee Ryan, Ai Uemura, Julieta Venegas, The Troubadours, Powderfinger, Nelly, Rammstein, Milli Vanilli, Modern Talking, Slayer, Shania Twain, Nikki Webster, Ville Valo, Christina Aguilera, Kelly Clarkson, Coldplay, Yellowcard, Hum, Rob Dougan, The All-American Rejects, Clannad, Iron Maiden, Maroon 5, Mayra Verónica, Backyard Babies, Hipster Daddy-O and the Handgrenades, Soda Stereo, Gustavo Cerati, Keane, HARD-Fi, Horace Andy, The Cure, The Killer Barbies, Joss Stone, Tom Jobim, Vinícius de Moraes, Elvis Costello, Paul Weller, Sara Evans, Sneaker Pimps, Take That (1991-1996), Five, Westlife, D-Pryde, Louis Tomlinson, Luke Friend and Mikolas Josef.

Through Zomba Music Publishing, BMG controlled the rights to Linkin Park, Britney Spears, Iron Maiden, 30 Seconds to Mars, R. Kelly, Justin Timberlake, Michael Jackson, Bowling for Soup, Daft Punk, Katatonia, Ne-Yo, Anthrax, Mudvayne, and Poison. These artists' European rights are currently controlled by Concord Music Publishing, through Imagem.

The company's songwriters wrote chart-topping hits for Mariah Carey, The Black Eyed Peas, Kenny Chesney, The Game, Mario, Rascal Flatts, Milli Vanilli, No Doubt, Thomas Anders, Jessica Simpson and 50 Cent as well as legends like Bob Dylan, Elvis Presley, Frank Sinatra and Roselyn Sánchez.

BMG Music Publishing was the global leader in Classical music and was number one in Contemporary Christian music.

Catalogues owned
Through international sub-publishing deals, BMG Music Publishing represented the catalogues of Famous Music Publishing, Walt Disney, Roadrunner Records, Leiber & Stoller, Fremantle Media, Pete Waterman, and Malaco Records in various territories.

BMG Music Publishing acquired Complete Music in 2006.

Brentwood-Benson Music Publishing was BMG Music Publishing's Christian publisher and owned over 60,000 copyrights. Like with other assets of BMG Music Publishing acquired by Universal Music, it was renamed to Universal Music Brentwood-Benson. It is nowadays managed by Capitol CMG Publishing, Universal Music's christian publishing operations under Capitol Christian Music Group.

BMG Rights Management

After Sony bought out Bertelsmann's share in Sony BMG, Bertelsmann was allowed to keep the rights to several recordings from the former joint venture and rights to BMG trademark. These songs served as the foundation to BMG Rights Management. The company was originally founded with capital support of KKR, and later became a wholly owned subsidiary of Bertelsmann. It now serves as a division within Bertelsmann and as a replacement to the defunct Bertelsmann Music Group.

Criticism

CD price fixing 

Between 1995 and 2000, music companies were found to have used illegal marketing agreements such as minimum advertised pricing to artificially inflate prices of compact discs in order to end price wars by discounters such as Best Buy and Target in the early 1990s.

A settlement in 2002 included the music publishers and distributors; Sony Music, Warner Music, Bertelsmann Music Group, EMI Music and Universal Music. In restitution for price fixing they agreed to pay a $67.4 million fine and distribute $75.7 million in CDs to public and non-profit groups but admitted no wrongdoing. It is estimated customers were overcharged by nearly $500 million and up to $5 per album.

See also 
 List of record labels
 Sony BMG Music Entertainment
 RCA Records
 RCA/Jive Label Group

References

External links
 Official Bertelsmann Music Group website
 
 Official Bertelsmann website
 

Bertelsmann subsidiaries
Defunct record labels of the United States
Defunct record labels of Germany
Record labels established in 1987
Record labels disestablished in 2008
Defunct companies based in New York City
American companies established in 1987
Mass media companies established in 1987
Mass media companies disestablished in 2008
Record label distributors